Ferdowsiyeh may refer to:
 Ferdowsiyeh, Narmashir, Kerman Province
 Ferdowsiyeh, Rafsanjan, Kerman Province
 Ferdowsiyeh, Azadegan, Rafsanjan County, Kerman Province
 Ferdowsiyeh, Yazd